The Gemsfairenstock is a mountain of the Glarus Alps, located on the border between the Swiss cantons of Uri and Glarus. It lies east of the Klausen Pass, on the range east of the Clariden.

A trail leads to its summit via the western ridge.

References

External links
Gemsfairenstock on Hikr

Mountains of Switzerland
Mountains of the canton of Uri
Mountains of the Alps
Mountains of the canton of Glarus
Glarus–Uri border
Two-thousanders of Switzerland